is a Japanese clothing company specializing in the production of cosplay costumes and other apparel for the otaku fan base. The company started in May 1995 as the child company of Broccoli.

External links

Cospa official website 
English part of official website
Cospa South East Asia official website
Cospa USA web site
INTERVIEW: Global Expansion for Otaku Fashion Brand COSPA - An interview with the co-founder of COSPA on Akibanana.com

Manufacturing companies based in Tokyo
Cosplay